The 2002–03 Football League Trophy, known as the 2002–03 LDV Vans Trophy for sponsorship reasons, was the 20th staging of the Football League Trophy, a knock-out competition for English football clubs in Second and Third Division. The winners were Bristol City and the runners-up were Carlisle United.

The competition began on 22 October 2002 and ended with the final on 6 April 2003 at the Millennium Stadium.

In the first round, there were two sections: North and South. In the following rounds each section gradually eliminates teams in knock-out fashion until each has a winning finalist. At this point, the two winning finalists face each other in the combined final for the honour of the trophy. In addition to the 48 League teams, 12 teams from the Football Conference were also invited to participate in the competition.

First round

Northern Section
Barnsley and Macclesfield Town were given byes to the second round.

Southern Section
Cardiff City and Brentford were given byes to the second round.

Second round

Northern Section

Southern Section

Quarter-finals

Northern Section

Southern Section

Area semi-finals

Northern Section

Southern Section

Area finals

Northern Area final

Southern Area final

Final

Notes
General
statto.com

Specific

EFL Trophy
Tro